Ibolya Nagy (born 27 November 1965) is a Hungarian former diver. She competed in the women's 10 metre platform event at the 1992 Summer Olympics.

References

External links
 

1965 births
Living people
Hungarian female divers
Olympic divers of Hungary
Divers at the 1992 Summer Olympics
People from Szentes
Sportspeople from Csongrád-Csanád County